Calliotropis ptykte is a species of sea snail, a marine gastropod mollusk in the family Eucyclidae.

Description
The length of the shell reaches 4.1 mm.

Distribution
This species occurs in the Pacific Ocean off Tonga.

References

External links
 

ptykte
Gastropods described in 2007